Frano Menegello Dinčić also spelled Frano Meneghello Dinčić (Kotor, Montenegro, 28 February 1900 - Belgrade, Yugoslavia, 1986) was a Yugoslav medalist and sculptor from Dalmatia.

Biography
He was born into a naval family, originally from Hvar. He lived in Split where he graduated from the School of Applied Arts and later the Academy Fine Arts in Prague, in the class of Professor Otakar Španiel. He further refined his skills in Paris and Munich. Before leaving for Belgrade in 1928, he worked from 1922 to 1924 as a lecturer in Split. He was a member of the Society of Fine Artists of Serbia. Menegello's artistic work was accomplished in relief modeling, including plastic portrait painting, which ensured the quality of his portrait medals, memorials, plaques and monuments. Vladeta Vojinović's research shows that the Order of the People's Hero (type 2), created at the ICOM in Zagreb, was designed by Frano Meneghello Dinčić.

Works
 10 Dinar coin
 20 Dinar coin
 Medal of Nada Todorović
 Bust of Nikola Tesla at Charles University in Prague, 1933
 Bust of King Peter II of Yugoslavia, 1939
 Plaque of Svetozar Marković
 Plaque of Branko Radičević
 Plaque of Jovan Sterija Popović
 Plaque of Vuk Karadžić

See also
 List of painters from Serbia

References 

 Translated from Serbo-Croatian Wikipedia: Frano Meneghello Dinčić

Further reading
Zlamalik, Vinko. Dinčić-Menegelo, Frano, u: Domljan, Žarko (gl. ur.) Likovna enciklopedija Jugoslavije, 1. sv. (A–J), Jugoslavenski leksikografski zavod »Miroslav Krleža«, 1984., str. 310-311., 
Vojinović, Vladeta. Frano Menegelo Dinčić, Društvo istoričara umetnosti Srbije, Beograd, 1988., (ukup. 158 str.)
Todorović, Nada. In memoriam : kipar i medaljer Frano Meneghello Dinčić // Numizmatičke vijesti, Zagreb, 1986., br. 40, str. 126-127.
Todorović, Nada. Medaljerski rad Frana Menegela Dinčića // Numizmatičke vijesti, Zagreb, 1964., br. 21., str. 30-37.
R. (novinar) Fran Menegelo Dinčić // Leskovački glasnik, Leskovac, 1932., god. XII, br. 13, str. 2-3.
Zlamalik, Vinko. I. memorijal Ive Kerdića (katalog), Galerija likovnih umjetnosti, Osijek — Strossmayerova galerija starih majstora, Zagreb, 1980., str. 95-98.
Gamulin, Grgo. Hrvatsko slikarstvo XX. stoljeća, svezak 1., svesci 3-4 (unutar sveska 1.) iz Povijesti umjetnosti u Hrvatskoj, "Naprijed", Zagreb, 1988., str. 305.

Yugoslav sculptors
Serbian sculptors
Male sculptors
Montenegrin sculptors
Croatian sculptors
1900 births
1986 deaths
Croats of Montenegro